Gurudwara Khalsa Sabha also known as Khalsa Sabha, Matunga is a Gurudwara in Matunga Road, Mumbai. It is adjacent Guru Nanak High School, Mahim sharing common compound. It is located behind the City Light Cinema, Guru Nanak Marg, in Matunga Road

References

Sikh places
Sikh organisations
Religious buildings and structures in Mumbai
Gurdwaras in Maharashtra